Beargrass Creek is the name given to several forks of a creek in Jefferson County, Kentucky. It is fairly small, with an average discharge of 103 cubic feet per second at River Road in Louisville.

As the forks wind through the area that has become Louisville's East End, they have contributed to the geography that has shaped the area. The origin of the name "Beargrass" is not clear, though local stories abound and it was written as "Baregrass Creek" and "Bear Grass Creek" in early maps.

Lyndon Lore states, "The name Beargrass was originally Bear Grasse, because the bears came to the creek for water and also for salt from the salt licks which were located near Salt River."

The earliest settlements by Europeans in the area were built in the form of stations, or forts, along the banks of the creek. The three forks drain about 70 square miles (181 km2) of land, and occasionally flood. Following the construction of the U.S. Army base at Bowman Field in 1940, it was found that the area's limestone was causing septic tanks in Seneca Gardens to malfunction and wash raw waste into the creek. Wartime rationing, feuding, and price disputes with Louisville delayed correcting the problem until 1946.

The three main branches are the South, Middle and Muddy Forks. They separate just east of Downtown Louisville. The South Fork runs through Butchertown and Germantown to west of Tyler Park, through the Poplar Level area (where the Beargrass Creek State Nature Preserve is located) and eventually the Fern Creek neighborhood. Eleven Jones Cave is located along this fork.

The south fork originally ran through downtown, but was rerouted in the 1850s. The original route was turned into a sewer. In the 1920s, the stretch near Germantown was placed into a concrete channel.  The current channelized state of the creek bed and Louisville's continued problems with Combined Sewer Overflows (CSOs) often leads to poor water quality in the creek.  Following heavy rain events one should avoid contact with the creek if at all possible.

The Beargrass Creek Alliance, a local volunteer watershed group of the Kentucky Waterways Alliance  does outreach and projects to improve the quality of Beargrass Creek.

The middle fork has two branches, called Weicher Creek and the Sinking Fork. Weicher Creek flows from the Hurstborne Area, and the Sinking Fork has its headwaters near Anchorage, Kentucky. They join in St. Matthews and flow through Cherokee Park until it meets the South Fork near the Bourbon Stockyards. The Muddy Fork rises at a stone springhouse in Windy Hills and runs parallel to the Ohio River and was rerouted during the construction of Interstate 71.

Although used just for drainage and as a scenic feature by the 20th century, in pioneer days it was navigable and used for that purpose.

See also
 List of rivers of Kentucky
 Geography of Louisville, Kentucky

References

External links
 Beargrass Creek State Nature Preserve (state site)
 Beargrass Creek State Nature Preserve (Louisville Nature Center site)
 Watershed information for Jefferson County
 Courier-Journal Special Report — "Beargrass Creek: Troubled streams of neglect, abuse"
 Beargrass Creek org 

Rivers of Kentucky
Tributaries of the Ohio River
Landforms of Louisville, Kentucky